Normal contact stiffness is a physical quantity related to the generalized force displacement behavior of rough surfaces in contact with a rigid body or a second similar rough surface. Rough surfaces can be seen as consisting of large numbers of asperities. As two solid bodies of the same material approach one another, the asperities interact, and they transition from conditions of non-contact to homogeneous bulk behaviour. The varying values of stiffness and true contact area that is exhibited at an interface during this transition are dependent on the conditions of applied pressure and are of importance for the study of systems involving the physical interactions of multiple bodies including granular matter, electrode contacts, and thermal contacts, where the interface-localized structures govern overall system performance.

Surface structure
The role of surface structure in normal contact mechanics, in terms of stiffness and true contact area is a frequently studied topic. Parameters of roughness, fractal dimension and asperity geometry are often discussed with reference to their significance on contact mechanics of surfaces.

References

Surfaces
Tribology
Mechanics
Friction
Classical mechanics
Force